Konrad Weichert (20 March 1934 – 8 February 2003) was a German sailor, born in Kurznie. He won a silver medal in the Dragon class together with Paul Borowski and Karl–Heinz Thun at the 1972 Summer Olympics.

References

External links
 
 
 

1934 births
2003 deaths
People from Opole County
Sportspeople from Opole Voivodeship
German male sailors (sport)
Sailors at the 1968 Summer Olympics – Dragon
Sailors at the 1972 Summer Olympics – Dragon
Olympic sailors of East Germany
Olympic silver medalists for East Germany
Olympic bronze medalists for East Germany
Olympic medalists in sailing
Medalists at the 1972 Summer Olympics
Medalists at the 1968 Summer Olympics